HaPalmach is a street in the Katamon neighborhood of Jerusalem.

History 
The street is named for the Palmach paramilitary forces (acronym for plugot makhatz, or shock troops) in Mandatory Palestine.

Folke Bernadotte was assassinated on HaPalmach street in 1948.

Notable buildings on the street include the L. A. Mayer Institute for Islamic Art.

References 

Streets in Jerusalem
Katamon